Washington Township is one of the twelve townships of Defiance County, Ohio, United States. The 2010 census found 1,617 people in the township, 1,263 of whom lived in the unincorporated portions of the township.

Geography
Located in the northern part of the county, it borders the following townships:
Pulaski Township, Williams County - north
Springfield Township, Williams County - northeast corner
Tiffin Township - east
Noble Township - southeast corner
Delaware Township - south
Mark Township - southwest corner
Farmer Township - west
Center Township, Williams County - northwest corner

The village of Ney is located in central Washington Township.

Name and history
Washington Township was established in 1838. Named for George Washington, first President of the United States, it is one of forty-three Washington Townships statewide.

Government
The township is governed by a three-member board of trustees, who are elected in November of odd-numbered years to a four-year term beginning on the following January 1. Two are elected in the year after the presidential election and one is elected in the year before it. There is also an elected township fiscal officer, who serves a four-year term beginning on April 1 of the year after the election, which is held in November of the year before the presidential election. Vacancies in the fiscal officership or on the board of trustees are filled by the remaining trustees.

Transportation
Significant highways in Washington Township include:
U.S. Route 127, which travels from north to south through the western half of the township
State Route 15, which travels from northwest to southeast through the center of the township
State Route 249, which travels west from its beginning in Ney to the Farmer Township line

References

External links
County website

Townships in Defiance County, Ohio
Townships in Ohio